In Greek mythology, Cranaus or Kranaos (Ancient Greek: Κραναός) was the second King of Athens, succeeding Cecrops I.

Family 
Cranaus married Pedias, a Spartan woman and daughter of Mynes, with whom he had three daughters: Cranaë, Cranaechme, and Atthis. Atthis gave her name to Attica after dying, possibly as a young girl, although in other traditions she was the mother, by Hephaestus, of Erichthonius. Rarus was also given as a son of Cranaus.

Reign 
Cranaus was supposed to have reigned for either nine or ten years and was an autochthonous (born from the earth), like his predecessor. During his reign the flood of the Deucalion story was thought to have occurred. In some accounts, Deucalion was said to have fled Lycorea to Athens with his sons Hellen and Amphictyon. Deucalion died shortly thereafter and was said to have been buried near Athens. Amphictyon is said to have married one of the daughters of Cranaus.

Cranaus was deposed by Amphictyon son of Deucalion, who was himself later deposed by Erichthonius. Cranaus fled to Lamptrae, where he died and was buried. His tomb was still there in the times of Pausanias. Cranaus was venerated as hero in Athens; his priests came from the family Charidae.

The people of Attica were referred to as Kranaoi after Cranaus, and Athens as Kranaa or Kranaai.

Notes

References
 Apollodorus, The Library with an English Translation by Sir James George Frazer, F.B.A., F.R.S. in 2 Volumes, Cambridge, MA, Harvard University Press; London, William Heinemann Ltd. 1921. . Online version at the Perseus Digital Library. Greek text available from the same website.
Aristophanes, Birds. The Complete Greek Drama. vol. 2. Eugene O'Neill, Jr. New York. Random House. 1938. Online version at the Perseus Digital Library.
Aristophanes, Aristophanes Comoediae edited by F.W. Hall and W.M. Geldart, vol. 2. F.W. Hall and W.M. Geldart. Oxford. Clarendon Press, Oxford. 1907. Greek text available at the Perseus Digital Library.
Herodotus, The Histories with an English translation by A. D. Godley. Cambridge. Harvard University Press. 1920. . Online version at the Topos Text Project. Greek text available at Perseus Digital Library.
 Pausanias, Description of Greece with an English Translation by W.H.S. Jones, Litt.D., and H.A. Ormerod, M.A., in 4 Volumes. Cambridge, MA, Harvard University Press; London, William Heinemann Ltd. 1918. . Online version at the Perseus Digital Library
Pausanias, Graeciae Descriptio. 3 vols. Leipzig, Teubner. 1903.  Greek text available at the Perseus Digital Library.
Pindar, Odes translated by Diane Arnson Svarlien. 1990. Online version at the Perseus Digital Library.
Pindar, The Odes of Pindar including the Principal Fragments with an Introduction and an English Translation by Sir John Sandys, Litt.D., FBA. Cambridge, MA., Harvard University Press; London, William Heinemann Ltd. 1937. Greek text available at the Perseus Digital Library.
Strabo, The Geography of Strabo. Edition by H.L. Jones. Cambridge, Mass.: Harvard University Press; London: William Heinemann, Ltd. 1924. Online version at the Perseus Digital Library.
Strabo, Geographica edited by A. Meineke. Leipzig: Teubner. 1877. Greek text available at the Perseus Digital Library.
Autochthons of classical mythology
Kings of Athens
Kings in Greek mythology
Attican characters in Greek mythology